The Mitchell Bowl is one of the two semifinal bowls of U Sports football, Canada's national competition for university teams that play Canadian football. It is held in the more westerly location of the two semifinal venues. The winner of this game goes on to play against the Uteck Bowl champions for the Vanier Cup. The home of the Mitchell Bowl, as well as the two conference champions, changes each year on a rotating basis. The Mitchell Bowl was named after Douglas H. Mitchell, a former Canadian Football League commissioner and member of the National Hockey League board of governors.

History
In 2001, U Sports, then known as CIS, voted to change the permanent site of the Atlantic Bowl in the interest of competitive fairness.
In 2002, the Mitchell Bowl was first awarded, replacing the Atlantic Bowl.
During 2002, the Mitchell Bowl played opposite to the Churchill Bowl.
In 2003, the Uteck Bowl replaced the Churchill Bowl.

The 2020 game was cancelled due to the COVID-19 pandemic.

List of Mitchell Bowl champions

Future participants
The teams and host sites of the Mitchell Bowl and the Uteck Bowl rotate on a six-year cycle, so that in each cycle each of the four conferences hosts and visits every other conference once. With the 2020 game cancelled, the cycle was delayed by one year with the 2020 teams playing in 2021.

The participants and sites for future Mitchell Bowl games are listed below:

All Mitchell Bowl games have been played at the home field of the host conference's champion. As of 2021, home teams have a record of 13–7.

Team win–loss records

References

External links
 Mitchell Bowl history

U Sports football trophies and awards